SDARM General Conference is the governing authority for the Seventh Day Adventist Reform Movement denomination. Officers of the General Conference are elected at a delegation session composed of delegates from the various international units and serve for a four-year term. The last delegation session was held August 25 to September 8, 2015 in Roanoke, Virginia, United States.

Officers

President

1st Vice-President

Secretary

Treasurer

See also 
 Seventh Day Adventist Reform Movement

References
The History of the Seventh Day Adventist Reform Movement. Alfons Balbach, Reformation Herald Publishing, 1999.
The Reformation Herald, January - March 2004, pp. 10, 34, 35.

General Conference
Roanoke, Virginia
Christian organizations established in 1925

de:Gemeinschaft der Siebenten Tags Adventisten Reformationsbewegung
es:Iglesia Adventista del Séptimo día Movimiento de Reforma
pl:Kościół Adwentystów Dnia Siódmego Ruch Reformacyjny
pt:Igreja Adventista do Sétimo Dia Movimento de Reforma